General elections were held in Trinidad and Tobago on 9 November 1981. The result was a victory for the People's National Movement, which won 26 of the 36 seats. Voter turnout was 56.4%.

Results

References

Trinidad
Elections in Trinidad and Tobago
1981 in Trinidad and Tobago